Zanjeer is a 2013 Indian action crime film directed by Apoorva Lakhia. The film is shot simultaneously in Hindi and Telugu languages, the latter titled Thoofan. A remake of the 1973 Hindi film of the same name, it stars Ram Charan (in his Hindi film debut) and Priyanka Chopra (in her Telugu film debut) with Sanjay Dutt in a pivotal role in the Hindi version who is replaced by Srihari in Telugu. Prakash Raj, Atul Kulkarni, and Mahie Gill play supporting roles. 

Upon release the film got mostly negative reviews.

Plot
  
ACP Vijay Khanna is a brutally honest police officer who has been transferred yet again by the system for chasing the corrupt underworld goons. He is continuously disturbed by the killing of his parents years back. He keeps remembering a man in a black raincoat on his birthday.

Vijay is in charge of a case where the district collector has been murdered and burned to death. The key eyewitness, Mala (Priyanka Chopra), has seen the murder by Teja's (Prakash Raj) gang and refuses to cooperate. Teja is the head of an oil mafia operation and does not want Mala alive. Vijay manages to convince Mala to give a statement which makes her perpetrators come after her. He gives her shelter in his house to protect her, and she starts to like him, while Vijay does not reciprocate the same. This includes her giving him a potato and egg for lunch at his office and then annoying him by celebrating his birthday. He shouts at her, and she begins to cry. Vijay tells her that he did not want to celebrate because his parents were killed on the very day and reveal his past to her. He finally reciprocates her love as he realized that Mala is slowly becoming an important part of his life.

Vijay also encounters Sher Khan, who is into buying and selling of illegal cars. Seeing Vijay's honesty and determination, Sher Khan turns over a new leaf and mends his ways to transform into a person who now only goes by the book. He has made Vijay a friend for life and will do anything to help him out. Vijay also encounters Jaydev a.k.a. JD, a reporter who had written bad comments about Vijay in the newspaper. Seeing Vijay's honesty and integrity, Jaydev becomes an admirer of Vijay and begins to give him all the information he has regarding the oil mafia.

Meanwhile, Kataria the man who murdered the collector, has been caught by Vijay. Kataria is revealed to be Teja's man, and he reveals that they steal petrol and oil from container trucks, add kerosene in them, and smuggle them around and outside the country. Vijay uses this information and puts Kataria in custody, but the next day, he is found murdered in custody. In the middle of this, Vijay also finds about a man named Prashant Khanna, who was killed years back by Teja. Due to certain incidents that gave Vijay wrong information about the oil mafia that Teja is handling, Vijay is suspended until the investigation is done with. Now, Vijay warns Teja that there are no seniors or rules that bind him, and now, Vijay will finish Teja in his own style. Slowly, Vijay begins to destroy almost all of Teja's oil refineries, but Mala says that all these activities that Vijay is doing can have dangerous consequences.

One night, Vijay and Mala go to a restaurant for dinner, where Vijay gets attacked by two of Teja's men in the bathroom. Vijay kills both the men and calls Teja and warns him that even if he sends the rest of his 248 men (it was earlier mentioned by Teja that he has 250 workers under him), nothing will happen to Vijay. A few days later, Sher Khan invites Vijay and Mala to a party. Later on, when they are returning home, they are attacked once again by 10 of Teja's men. Vijay manages to lock Mala in a small room there and gets badly injured fighting them. He is almost killed, but just in time, Sher Khan comes there, handles the rest of the goons, and along with Mala, and takes Vijay to the hospital.

The next day, Teja comes there and criticizes Vijay, saying that he is one who can only talk and does not have the guts to face Teja. After he leaves, Mala finally tells Vijay to finish Teja once and for all. That night, Teja's men, along with Teja's trusted man Bosco, kill Jaydev, and the whole city begins to panic. Meanwhile, two sub-inspectors who work under Vijay give Sher Khan information that on the night when Kataria was murdered, Inspector Saalwe had arrested a man for a petty case, but Saalwe did not record the case, and so they suspect that Saalwe and the man he arrested had killed Kataria. So, using some of his informers, Sher Khan finds Saalwe and Bosco, who was hiding himself and Saalwe in a colony. Then, he puts them in front of the commissioner, and they agree that they had killed Kataria by breaking his neck, and they had done it on Teja's saying, as he feared that Kataria might leak all the information about his gang. The commissioner realizes Vijay's innocence and claims Teja as a wanted criminal.

Out of fear, Teja runs away into an old mine with Mona, but Vijay manages to track him down. Teja manages to get Vijay at gunpoint and pulls his coat's sleeve back.  Then, Vijay notices a tattoo on Teja's arm and realizes that he is the one who killed his parents. Then, Vijay says that Prashant, who Teja killed years back, was Vijay's father. Teja is shocked and reveals that Prashant had filed a case against him, and so, Teja had to kill Prashant. In a fit of rage, Vijay begins to beat Teja badly. Vijay then breaks Teja's arm, kicks him into a bundle of petroleum barrels, and then shoots the barrels, causing Teja to die in the blast. The government announces all the wealth to be given to Mona, who was also said to be in all of Teja's nefarious activities. The film ends with Sher Khan and Mala coming to visit Vijay at the station, Mala finally being able to cook some food for him, and Vijay smiling at Sher Khan when he sees a drug mafia case coming on TV.

Cast

Marketing
The first look and theatrical trailer of Zanjeer (Hindi version) were released on 4 July 2013. The dubbing process started from 26 March 2013, where Sanjay Dutt plays the role played by Srihari. Sanjay Dutt finished Zanjeer filming − with only a few days left at his disposal before returning to jail. One of India's leading male voice artist Viraj Adhav dubbed the voice of Ramcharan. Zanjeer in US by BlueSky. The first look and official theatrical trailer of Thoofan (Telugu version) were launched by Reliance Entertainment on its YouTube Official Channel on 25 March 2013 featuring Ram Charan, Priyanka Chopra, Prakash Raj and Srihari. The Telugu version was then dubbed and released in Tamil during January 2017 as Super Police.

Production

Casting
Director Apoorva Lakhia signed up Telugu star Ram Charan and Priyanka Chopra for the lead roles. Prakash Raj was roped in to play the character of Teja. There were reports that Sonu Sood and Arjun Rampal were being considered for the role of Sher Khan. It was also reported that Sanjay Dutt was cast for the role. In September 2012, The Times of India reported that both Arjun Rampal and Sanjay Dutt opted out citing date issues and the makers had finalised Sonu Sood for the role. Later Sanjay Dutt was chosen to play the character in the Hindi version, while Srihari portrayed the same character in the Telugu version. Bindu's iconic 'Mona Darling' act was taken over by Mahi Gill, after talks with actresses Jacqueline Fernandez, Mallika Sherawat and Malaika Arora Khan fell through. Atul Kulkarni was seen in a new role in this film. After Sonu Sood was injured in the CCL match playing for Mumbai Heroes, he was replaced with Srihari for the Sher Khan role in Thoofan. Popular TV artist Kavitha Kaushik was roped in for a special song in the movie. Zanjeers script cost  and was re-bought by Apoorva Lakhia.

Filming
The Telugu version of the film is titled Thoofan. Priyanka Chopra took an acting fee of  while Ram charan was paid as highest debut hero with an acting fee of  including Toofan. The director planned for a 25-day schedule in Hyderabad, Andhra Pradesh from 14 November to 5 December 2012.

Post-production

Soundtrack

Critical reception
The film received mixed to negative reviews from the critics. 
Taran Adarsh rated 3/5 telling "The new Zanjeer borrows from the original, but it is more of an updated avatar of that film. On the whole, Zanjeer is a triumph for Ram Charan, who gets abundant opportunity to exhibit his talent and scores exceedingly well. However, the film comes across as a regular masala fare that caters to the single screen spectator mainly and also for enthusiasts of typical Bollywood entertainers." Meena Iyer of The Times of India rates 3/5 telling "Yet, this film should be judged as a stand-alone offering because attempts to compare the two versions will find the current one falling short, especially in the dialogue and music departments. Ram Charan, as the brooding policeman, excels in action. His dark eyes with long lashes adeptly convey anger. Sanjay Dutt is competent and lovable."

Its affiliation newspaper Mumbai Mirror gave a 1.5 star rating and the reviewer Karan Anshuman said "If Salim-Javed do watch this film, one wouldn't be surprised if they decided to give the money and 'core story' credit back and disassociate themselves from this embarrassment of a "remake". Anupama Chopra termed the movie 'a ramshackle remake' and wrote, "This remake is wrong on so many levels that I don’t know where to begin. This isn’t a film. It’s sacrilege."

Raja Sen of Rediff.com gave a zero rating and said it was an unforgivably bad remake. Shubra Gupta of The Indian Express said "It's neither faithful remake nor campy, knowing tribute. It's just a poor copy". Rajeev Masand of IBN-live gave 0/5 saying "The new 'Zanjeer' isn't just a bad film, it's a shameless exercise in laziness."

India Today – "Zanjeer makes it to the list of the worst films ever made". Times of Oman – "It would be a sin to compare this lazy attempt to the original. Even as a standalone film, it fails miserably".

MSN India – "Thoofan is like paying money to dig your own grave." Sunday Guardian – "Two and a half hours of uninterrupted idiocy".

Box office
Zanjeer/Toofan was released in 2,085 theatres in India and about 3550 theatres worldwide.

References

External links
 
 

Hindi-language action films
Indian multilingual films
2013 films
Remakes of Indian films
Indian action films
2013 action films
2010s Hindi-language films
2010s Telugu-language films
Films shot in Hyderabad, India
Fictional portrayals of the Maharashtra Police
Films set in Mumbai
Films shot in Mumbai
2013 masala films
Indian vigilante films
2010s vigilante films
Films scored by Anand Raj Anand
Reliance Entertainment films
Journalism adapted into films
Films with screenplays by Salim–Javed
2013 multilingual films
Films directed by Apoorva Lakhia